The 2018 Individual Long Track/Grasstrack World Championship is the 48th edition of the FIM speedway Individual Long Track World Championship.

Venues

Current Classification

References 

2018
Speedway competitions in France
Speedway competitions in Germany
Speedway competitions in the Netherlands
Long
2018 in Dutch motorsport
2018 in German motorsport
2018 in French motorsport